Anna's Archive is a free non-profit online shadow library metasearch engine providing access to a variety of book resources (also via IPFS), created by a team of anonymous archivists (referred to as Anna and/or the Pirate Library Mirror (PiLiMi) team), and launched in direct response to law enforcement efforts, formally assisted by The Publishers Association and the Authors Guild, to close down Z-Library in November 2022.

As such, the Anna's Archive team claims to provide metadata access to Open Library materials, to be a backup of the Library Genesis, Sci-Hub and Z-Library shadow libraries, presents ISBN information, has no copyrighted materials on its website, and only indexes metadata that is already publicly available. Anna's Archive notes that their website, a non-profit project, accepts donations to cover costs (hosting, domain names, development and related). Nonetheless, besides the recently launched Anna's Archive website, many other alternative workarounds to the recent attempts to take down the Z-Library website have been reported.

Description
Anna's Archive notes that "information wants to be free", and that team members "strongly believe in the free flow of information, and preservation of knowledge and culture". According to the website, Anna's Archive ("search engine of shadow libraries: books, papers, comics, magazines") is a "project that aims to catalog all the books in existence, by aggregating data from various sources ... [and to] track humanity's progress toward making all these books easily available in digital form, through 'shadow libraries'." The team also noted, "We are at the other end of the spectrum [from Z-Library and related]; being very careful not to leave any trace, and having strong operational security.” According to the Anna's Archive website: "Spread the word about Anna’s Archive on Twitter, Reddit,  TikTok, Instagram, at your local cafe or library, or wherever you go! We don’t believe in gatekeeping — if we get taken down we’ll just pop right up elsewhere, since all our code and data is fully open source."

Nonetheless, besides the recently launched Anna's Archive website, many other alternative workarounds to the recent attempts to take down the Z-Library website have been reported. Some of these purported alternative sites have submitted unusual takedown requests of their own, according to news reports. More recently, on February 11, 2023, Z-Library is reported to have returned to the regular Internet via private personal domains created from accounts on the platform.

See also 

 Electronic Frontier Foundation
 Freedom of information
 #ICanHazPDF (hashtag)
 Library Genesis
 Open Library
 Sci-Hub
 Shadow library
 Z-Library

References

External links

 Anna's Archive:  
 Anna's Archive: Related links:
(about/blog/software)
(reddit/subreddit/twitter)

 PiLiMi team website
 Profile (BuiltWith; Nov 2022)
 "Right-Now" status of website
 Nexus - Academic searcher

Academic publishing
Book websites
Digital libraries
Ebooks
 
File sharing communities
 
Intellectual property activism
Open access projects
Science websites
Free search engine software
Shadow libraries